Juan Manuel Arza Muñuzuri (17 October 1932 – 15 March 2019) was a Spanish politician and lawyer from Navarre. He served as the second  President of the Government of Navarre from 29 September 1980 until 14 January 1984.

References

1932 births
2019 deaths
Presidents of the Government of Navarre
Politicians from Navarre
20th-century Spanish lawyers